Frédéric-Adolphe-Maximilien-Gustave Salvemini de Castillon (Utrecht, Netherlands, 22 September 1747 - Berlin 27 January 1814) was a Music theorist.

His father was the professor Giovanni Francesco Salvemini, who taught mathematics and philosophy at the University of Utrecht. Giovanni  adopted the name "de Castillon" in reference to his natal town of Castiglione in Tuscany, Italy.

Member of the Berlin Academy, Castillon published a large volume of  Research of the Beauty of applied music to, melody, harmony, and rhythm.

Likewise his father, Castillon contributed to the creation of  the Encyclopédie, ou dictionnaire raisonné des sciences, des arts et des métiers of  Diderot and D'Alembert, the accurate creation of his articles in the domain of applied arts of music theory, musical instruments, and its history; paved for Frederick his place in the world of music historians.

Notes

References 
 François-Joseph Fétis, Biographie universelle des musiciens et bibliographie générale de la musique, Paris, Firmin-Didot, t., 1883, p. 208.

Dutch music theorists
1747 births
1814 deaths